Wilker is a name. Notable people with the name include:

Given name
Wilker (footballer, born 1987), full name Wilker Pereira dos Santos, Brazilian football forward
Wilker Ángel (born 1993), Venezuelan football centre-back
Wilker (footballer, born 1995), full name Wilker Henrique da Silva, Brazilian football forward

Surname
Hermann Wilker (1874–1941), German rower
José Wilker (1944–2014), Brazilian actor and director
Jonathan Wilker (fl. 2010s), American scientist and engineer
Josh Wilker (fl. 2010s), American writer

See also